Euphorbia caducifolia is a subtropical succulent species of flowering plant in the family Euphorbiaceae. It is found in India where it is known as the leafless milk hedge.

Description
The succulent stems branch frequently and tend to grow vertically. E. caducifolia resembles the leafy milk hedge (Euphorbia nivulia) but differs in having multiple stems, and smaller, more transitory leaves. The flowers are orange-red and appear in February and March.

Distribution and habitat
Euphorbia caducifolia has a rather limited distribution in the Thar Desert in the northwestern part of the Indian subcontinent, on the boundary between India and Pakistan. This is an area of sandy hills and shifting sand dunes, with clumps of thorny vegetation, low trees, grasses and scrub.

Ecology
In southern Rajasthan, some of the hills are well clad with vegetation, and there Euphorbia caducifolia is associated with Butea monosperma,  Millettia pinnata , Syzygium hyrianium, Wrightia tinctoria and Ziziphus nummularia. In the arid region near Sambhar Salt Lake, it is associated with thorny scrub such as Anogeissus pendula and Boswellia.

Uses
The latex of Euphorbia caducifolia has been used in Pakistan as an anti-tumour agent, and the roots are also said to have anti-tumour properties. The latex has also been used historically to promote the healing of wounds, and research has shown that it does indeed exhibit significant wound healing activity. The plant is also a rich source of hydrocarbons (C-15 compounds) that can be processed to produce a biodiesel fuel.

References

caducifolia
Flora of the Indian subcontinent
Plants described in 1914